Syclix is a surgical tool used in minimally invasive surgical procedures, inspired by surgeon John Wickham and designed by Random Design Ltd. It was the winner of the 2006 Horner’s Plastics Innovation and Design Award. Rather than using a ring grip, which was more restricting and tiring for surgeons, control of the instrument is through rolling it with the forefinger and thumb, like a pen. The jaws are controlled with minimal arm movement. It is built and assembled by Sovrin Plastics.

References 

Surgical instruments